Aliabad-e Shahid (also Romanized as ‘Alīābād-e Shahīd; also known as ‘Alīābād) is a village in Darbqazi Rural District, in the Central District of Nishapur County, Razavi Khorasan Province, Iran. At the 2006 census, its population was 145, in 45 families.

See also 

 List of cities, towns and villages in Razavi Khorasan Province

References 

Populated places in Nishapur County